Alexander Kazbegi Avenue is one of the main avenues of Tbilisi and is named after the writer Alexander Kazbegi. The avenue is located on the right bank of the Kura River in the Saburtalo and Vake districts of Tbilisi and starts at Pekini Avenue and ends at Petre Kavtaradze street. In 1941 it was originally named Pavlov street. The development of the street began in 1956 with several administrative educational buildings. In 1990 Pavlov street was renamed into Alexander Kazbegi Avenue.

References

Streets in Tbilisi
Saburtalo